Tom Palmer is a British author of children's books.

Palmer was born in Leeds. He cites football articles for getting him interested in reading as a child. He was encouraged to read by his mother, who died in 1992 at the age of 54. He graduated from university and worked in libraries and book shops before becoming a published author. He published his first book in 2002. In 2018, Palmer wrote a new book for the Roy of the Rovers series. In 2019, he received the Ruth Rendell Award. In 2020, he published his 50th book.

In 2021, Palmer's book After the War was longlisted for the Carnegie Medal.

Palmer currently lives in Halifax. He is a supporter of Leeds United F.C. and has written a book titled If You're Proud to be a Leeds Fan.

Select bibliography 
Palmer has written books on various topics, including football and history.
 Over the Line (2014)
 Armistice Runner (2018)
 D-Day Dog (2019)
 After the War (2020)
Arctic Star (2021)

Football Academy 

 Teamwork (prequel)
 Reading the Game 
 The Real Thing 
 Striking Out
 Captain Fantastic
 Free Kick

References 

Writers from Leeds
English male novelists
21st-century British novelists
1960s births
Living people